Desk Set (released as His Other Woman in the UK) is a 1957 American romantic comedy film directed by Walter Lang and starring Spencer Tracy and Katharine Hepburn. The screenplay was written by Phoebe Ephron and Henry Ephron from the 1955 play of the same name by William Marchant.

Plot
Bunny Watson is in charge of the reference library at the Federal Broadcasting Network in Midtown Manhattan. The reference librarians are responsible for researching facts and answering questions for the general public on all manner of topics, great and small. Bunny has been romantically involved for seven years with rising network executive Mike Cutler, but with no marriage in sight.

Methods Engineer and efficiency expert Richard Sumner is the inventor of EMERAC ("Electromagnetic MEmory and Research Arithmetical Calculator"), nicknamed “Emmy,” a powerful early generation computer (referred to then as an “electronic brain”).  He is brought in to see how the library functions, and size it up for installation of one of his massive machines.

Despite Bunny’s initial intransigence, he is surprised and intrigued to discover how stunningly capable and engaging she is.

When her staff finds out the computer is coming, they jump to the conclusion they are being replaced. Their fears seem to be confirmed when everyone on the staff receives a pink “layoff” slip printed out by a similar new EMERAC already installed in payroll. It turns out to have been a mistake - the machine fired everybody in the company, including the president!

After an innocuous but seemingly salacious situation that Cutler walks in on at Bunny’s apartment, he recognizes the older Sumner has emerged as a romantic rival, and begins to want to commit to Bunny.

Meanwhile, it is revealed that the network is secretly negotiating a merger with another company. The network has kept everything hush-hush to avoid tipping off competitors. Rather than replace the research staff, “Emmy” was installed to help the employees cope with the extra work that will result from the combined businesses.

With the threat of displacement  out of the way, Sumner reveals his romantic interest to Watson, but she believes that EMERAC will always be his first love. He denies it, but then Watson puts him to the test, pressing the machine beyond its limits. Sumner resists the urge to fix it as long as possible, but finally gives in and forces an emergency shutdown. Watson then accepts his marriage proposal.

Cast

Production

In the play, Watson (played by Shirley Booth, who was originally intended for the film as well) had only brief interactions with Sumner, and somewhat hostile. Screenwriters Phoebe and Henry Ephron (the parents of Nora Ephron) built up the role of the efficiency expert and tailored the interactions between him and the researcher to fit Spencer Tracy and Katharine Hepburn.

The exterior shots of the "Federal Broadcasting Network" seen in the film is actually the RCA Building (now known as the Comcast Building) at 30 Rockefeller Center in Rockefeller Center, the headquarters of NBC.

The character of Bunny Watson was based on Agnes E. Law, a real-life librarian at CBS who retired about a year before the film was released.

This film was the eighth screen pairing of Hepburn and Tracy, after a five-year respite since 1952's Pat and Mike, and was a first for Hepburn and Tracy in several ways: the first non-MGM film the two starred in together, their first color film, and their first CinemaScope film. Following Desk Set their last film together would be 1967's Guess Who's Coming to Dinner.

The computer referred to as EMERAC is a homoiophone metonym for ENIAC ("Electronic Numerical Integrator And Computer"), which was developed in the 1940s and was the first electronic general-purpose computer. Parts of the EMERAC computer, particularly the massive display of moving square lights, would later be seen in various 20th Century Fox productions including both the motion picture (1961) and TV (1964-68) versions of Voyage to the Bottom of the Sea and the Edgar Hopper segment of What a Way to Go!.

The researchers furnish incorrect information about the career of baseball player Ty Cobb.  Miss Costello claims his major league career lasted for 21 years, and that he played only for the Detroit Tigers.  In fact, he played for 24 years—22 with Detroit, and his final two seasons with the Philadelphia Athletics.

Reception
Bosley Crowther, film critic of The New York Times, felt the film was "out of dramatic kilter", inasmuch as Hepburn was simply too "formidable" to convincingly play someone "scared by a machine", resulting in "not much tension in this thoroughly lighthearted film".

Today the film is seen far more favorably, with the sharpness of the script praised in particular. It has achieved a rare 100% rating on Rotten Tomatoes based on 22 reviews, with a weighted average of 6.78/10. The site's consensus reads: "Desk Set reunites one of cinema's most well-loved pairings for a solidly crafted romantic comedy that charmingly encapsulates their timeless appeal". Dennis Schwartz of Osuz' World Movie Reviews called it an "inconsequential sex comedy", but contended "the star performers are better than the material they are given to work with" and that "the comedy was so cheerful and the banter between the two was so refreshingly smart that it was easy to forgive this bauble for not being as rich as many of the legendary duo's other films together."

Legacy
A Canadian radio program, Bunny Watson, was named for and inspired by Hepburn's character.

The film is recognized by American Film Institute in these lists:
 2002: AFI's 100 Years...100 Passions – Nominated

See also
 List of American films of 1957

References

External links

 
 
 
 

1957 films
1957 romantic comedy films
20th Century Fox films
American films based on plays
American romantic comedy films
Films about computing
Films about technological impact
Films directed by Walter Lang
Films scored by Cyril J. Mockridge
Films set around New Year
Films set in libraries
Films set in Manhattan
Workplace comedy films
CinemaScope films
1950s English-language films
1950s American films
Films about librarians